They Met in Guayaquil (Spanish:Se conocieron en Guayaquil) is a 1949 Ecuadorian drama film directed by Paco Villar. The film was the first sound film made in Ecuador, which had a very small film industry at the time. The film  was a commercial success on its release. The title refers to Guayaquil, the country's largest city. The production company followed it up with another sound film Dawn in Pichincha in 1950.

Partial cast
 Antonio Arboleda 
 Anita Burgos 
 Paco Villar
 Olga Eljuri de Villar
 Fernad Nunez

References

Bibliography 
 Handelsman, Michael. Culture and Customs of Ecuador. Greenwood Publishing Group, 2000. 
 Rist, Peter H. Historical Dictionary of South American Cinema. Rowman & Littlefield, 2014.

External links 
 

1949 films
1949 drama films
Ecuadorian drama films
1940s Spanish-language films
Films set in Ecuador
Ecuadorian black-and-white films